A font catalog or font catalogue is a collection of specimen of typefaces offering sample use of the fonts for the included typefaces, originally in the form of a printed book. The definition has also been applied to websites offering a specimens collection similar to what a printed catalog provides.

The purpose of a font catalog is to aid a typesetter or graphical designer to choose an appropriate typeface, or narrow down candidates for the typesetting or design process.

See also
Samples of serif typefaces
Samples of sans serif typefaces
Samples of monospaced typefaces
Samples of display typefaces
Samples of script typefaces

References

Typography
Catalogues